Tuseh Kaleh (also Romanized as Tūseh Kaleh and Tūseh Kelh; also known as Tusakhilya) is a village in Aliyan Rural District, Sardar-e Jangal District, Fuman County, Gilan Province, Iran. At the 2006 census, its population was 580.

References 

Populated places in Fuman County